The Oreos Athletic Club or Ashbury Oreos were an early professional American football team, established in 1903, and based in Asbury Park, New Jersey. The team is best remembered for playing in the 1903 World Series of Football at Madison Square Garden. During the Series, the Oreos played against the Watertown Red & Black in a hard-fought 5–0 loss. The team lost another game during the event to the Orange Athletic Club by a score of 22–0. According to reports, Watertown won the game on a controversial touchdown call, by the referee, in the second half of the game. Fighting and rioting soon broke out between the Oreos and Watertown fans, before being contained by the New York Police Department.

References

Orange Athletic Club of New Jersey: Complete Football Records

Early professional American football teams in New York (state)
American football teams established in 1903
American football teams disestablished in 1903
World Series of Football (1902–03)
American football teams in New York City
Defunct American football teams in New Jersey
Asbury Park, New Jersey
American football teams in the New York metropolitan area
1903 establishments in New Jersey
1903 disestablishments in New Jersey
 Athletic Club football teams and seasons